Avenida do Doutor Rodrigo Rodrigues is multi-lane street at the South of the Macau peninsula starting close behind Grand Lisboa and Club Militaire and ending close to the Outer Harbour Ferry Terminal station.

Naming 

The street Avenida do Doutor Rodrigo Rodrigues was named after Rodrigo José Rodrigues who was governor of Macau from 1923 to 1925.

Major buildings 

Amongst others, the Casa Real Hotel and Casino and the Hotel Beverly Plaza are located at the Avenida do Doutor Rodrigo Rodrigues.

See also
 List of roads in Macau

Gallery

References

Roads in Macau